Aelia Pulcheria (19 January 398 or 399 – July 453) was an Eastern Roman empress who advised her brother emperor Theodosius II during his minority and then became wife to emperor Marcian from November 450 to her death in 453.

She was the second (and oldest surviving) child of Eastern Roman Emperor Arcadius and Empress Aelia Eudoxia. In 414, the fifteen-year old Pulcheria became the guardian of her younger brother Theodosius II and was also proclaimed Augusta. Through her religious devotion and involvement in the contemporary ecclesiastical scene, Pulcheria had significant, though changing, influence and political power during her brother's reign. When Theodosius II died on 26 July 450, Pulcheria married Marcian on 25 November 450, while simultaneously not violating her vow of virginity. She died three years later, in July 453.

Pulcheria influenced the Christian Church and its theological development by being involved in the Council of Ephesus and guiding the Council of Chalcedon, in which the Church ruled on christological issues. The Roman Catholic Church and the Eastern Orthodox Church subsequently recognized her as a saint.

Early life
Pulcheria was born into the Theodosian dynasty, whose Eastern branch in the later Roman Empire ruled in Constantinople. Her parents were eastern Roman emperor Arcadius and empress Aelia Eudoxia. Pulcheria's older sister, Flaccilla, was born in 397 but probably died young. Her younger siblings were Arcadia (born in 400), Theodosius II, the future emperor (born in 401) and Marina (born in 401).

Arcadius' reign experienced the conflict between his wife and the Archbishop of Constantinople John Chrysostom. Sozomen reports that much of the rivalry was based on a silver statue set up in honour of Eudoxia outside the cathedral of Constantinople, Hagia Sophia, which Chrysostom condemned: "The silver statue of the empress … was placed upon a column of porphyry; and the event was celebrated by loud acclamations, dancing, games, and other manifestations of public rejoicing … John declared that these proceedings reflected dishonor on the [C]hurch." Also according to Sozomen, Chrysostom had condemned the empress for her grandiose style in his sermons, which enraged her and resulted in Chrysostom's immediate deposition. Later in life, Pulcheria returned the relics of John Chrysostom and installed them for the church, in gratitude for his pious life.

Sister of the emperor

Eudoxia died in 404, and Arcadius in 408. They left behind four young children, including Theodosius II, then 7 years of age, who had been his father's nominal co-emperor since 402 and was now sole emperor himself. The praetorian prefect Anthemius at first led government affairs. The imperial chamberlain Antiochus educated Theodosius in the meantime but the emperor, upon reaching adulthood, dismissed him from office. In 414, Pulcheria began to act as her brother and his government's guardian: Theodosius proclaimed Pulcheria Augusta on 4 July 414, Pulcheria was a deo coronata and possessed basileia. At the same time, Pulcheria and her sisters made vows of virginity, to keep off potential suitors. After this, the imperial palace assumed a monastic tone more so than the previous regime. Sozomen describes the pious ways of Pulcheria and her sisters in his Ecclesiastical History:
They all pursue the same mode of life; they are sedulous in their attendance in the house of prayer, and evince great charity towards strangers and the poor…and pass their days and their nights together in singing the praises of God.

Rituals within the imperial palace included chanting and reciting passages of sacred scripture and fasting twice per week. The sisters relinquished luxurious jewelry and apparel which most women of the imperial court wore. Pulcheria assembled the emperor's imperial announcements and provided many instruction necessary for Theodosius to be a successful emperor when he would come of age. According to Sozomen, Pulcheria's training of Theodosius included good deportment, horsemanship, and how to don clothes. Not only did Pulcheria train her brother in the duties and customs of imperial office, but she also ensured that Theodosius was trained to become a pious Christian leader. However Theodosius was accused by some people of providing poor leadership.

Vow of virginity

She also took a vow of virginity in 414, and her sisters followed her example. Sozomen explains that:

She devoted her virginity to God, and instructed her sisters to do likewise. To avoid cause of scandal and opportunities for intrigue, she permitted no man to enter her palace. In confirmation of her resolution she took God, the priests, and all the subjects of the Roman empire as witnesses ...

In a letter from Pope Leo I, a contemporary of Pulcheria, he complimented her great piety and despisal of the errors of heretics. It is possible that Pulcheria may have had another motive to remain unmarried: she would have had to relinquish her power to a potential husband. In addition, the husbands of Pulcheria and her sisters could have wielded overbearing influence on their young brother, or even posed a threat to him.

Role as Augusta

Pulcheria also attained the title of augusta when she vowed her virginity in 414 and was highly esteemed at court. In the Byzantine Senate a bust was erected in her honour along with those of other augusti.

Church and Judaism
Many important events occurred during her time as augusta and her brother's reign as Emperor; however, Pulcheria's influence was mostly ecclesiastical. Pulcheria and her brother potentially harboured anti-Jewish sentiments, which may have contributed to laws against Jewish worship in the capital. Before the reign of Theodosius II, synagogues were treated as private property and protected by the imperial government. Theodosius enacted a law that forbade the construction of synagogues and required the destruction of those in existence. Pulcheria and Theodosius also ordered the execution of a group of Jews after strife among Christians emerged in Palestine. Kenneth Holum writes "Pulcheria had long nursed a special hatred for Jews and Nestorian Christianity, which appeared to contemporaries to be of Jewish origin, no doubt served to confirm that hatred."

Pulcheria was also famous for her philanthropy. She erected many churches and buildings for the poor in and around Constantinople. Pulcheria's building projects in Constantinople were so vast that a whole district was named the Pulcherianai in her honour. As well as contributing new churches and districts to the city, Pulcheria contributed significantly to the Christian Church by reinstating bishops who were dismissed and returning the remains of others, such as Flavian, as relics of the church.

War with Persia

Pulcheria's time as Augusta also was marked by war and ongoing conflict with Sassanid Persia. The imperial court called for war against Persia when Persian King Yazdegerd I executed a Christian bishop who had destroyed a Zoroastrian altar. Theodosius sent troops into battle, described by Socrates as "ready to do anything for the sake of Christianity." Though the war was inconclusive, a surviving inscription declares that Theodosius was able to conquer through his sisters' vow of virginity. Theodosius thus made his sister's virginity a tool of war propaganda, and because of her vow to be faithful only to God, the hand of God would help Roman troops in battle against Persia.

Relationship with Aelia Eudocia
The relationship between Pulcheria and Aelia Eudocia, Theodosius II's wife, was strained. The two women over the years had developed a rivalry possibly based on their different backgrounds and religious beliefs. Eudocia was originally named Athenais and was born in Athens to a Greek philosopher and professor of rhetoric. When her father died, he left her with little means, only "one hundred gold coins". She visited her aunt in Constantinople out of desperation. On 7 June 421, Theodosius married Athenais, but her name was changed to Eudocia. Opinions differ as to whether Pulcheria really recommended Eudocia to her brother, a claim made by John Malalas. The rivalry between the two women was posed by some scholars to have been motivated by Eudocia's envy of Pulcheria's power in court.

Centuries later, Theophanes the Confessor wrote that Eudocia and the chief minister, the eunuch Chrysaphius, convinced Theodosius to rely less on his sister's influence and more on that of his new wife. This caused Pulcheria in the late 440s to leave the imperial palace and live in "…Hebdomon, a seaport seven miles from Constantinople." However, the chronology of her departure does not support Theophanes' narrative. The rivalry of Eudocia and Pulcheria may have come to a head when Eudocia departed for the Holy Land and, for a time, openly supported monastic Miaphysitism. Nonetheless, the sources do not speak of any dispute between them in this period.

Empress
While hunting on horseback in 450, Theodosius II fell from his horse and injured his spine; he died 2 days later from the injury. What exactly happened in government during the interregnum is unclear. It is speculated by some historians that she reigned over the Empire alone for about one month after the death of Theodosius, which may have primarily consisted of arranging the public funeral of Theodosius. As the deceased emperor lacked surviving male children, Pulcheria could bestow dynastic legitimacy on an outsider by marrying him. She honoured her vow of virginity despite entering a legitimate marriage. She married Marcian, a tribune and close associate of general Aspar, probably at the general's suggestion. Marcian's origins were of low status in comparison to those of previous emperors: "Marcian was a man of little substance, with no ancient aristocratic or imperial blood. He was Roman, however, and thus the bond of kedeia at once communicated eligibility for basileia." One condition of the marriage was that Marcian obey and respect Pulcheria's vow of virginity, and he complied with it. In order for the marriage to not seem scandalous to the Roman state, the church proclaimed that "Christ himself sponsored the union and it therefore should not provoke shock or unjustified suspicions." After their marriage, Pulcheria and Marcian had Chrysaphius killed.

Ecclesiastical conflicts
The First Council of Ephesus, held in 431 in Theodosius's reign, involved two rival bishops: Nestorius, who was Archbishop of Constantinople, and Cyril, the Patriarch of Alexandria. The dispute grew from their disagreement over the nature of Christ.

Nestorius advocated diminishing the influence of the doctrine of the "Theotokos", i.e., "the one who gives birth to the One Who is God" or "Mother of God", in the church. This conflicted with the religious beliefs of Pulcheria, as she was a virgin empress, and a rivalry between them ensued, during which Nestorius launched a smear campaign against her. Nestorius also tried to remove Pulcheria's image and her altar cloth from the altar, against her wishes. However, Pulcheria and her allies, including Eusebius of Dorylaeum, struck back by launching a campaign against Nestorius. Meanwhile, Cyril had already publicly condemned Nestorius and wrote to the imperial court stating that the doctrine of the "Theotokos" was correct. Theodosius and his advisors decided to hold a council, thereby allowing Nestorius an opportunity to vindicate himself.

However, the Council, teeming with Cyril's allies, condemned Nestorius' position. Nestorians, who were unable to take part in the previous council, held their own council to denounce Cyril. The emperor first tried to find a middle ground but eventually favored Cyril. The title of "Theotokos" was decreed as orthodox. He also deposed Nestorius and banished him to a monastery in Antioch. Thus, Pulcheria's campaign against Nestorius was successful, but ecclesiastical controversies did not stop there.

In 449, christological debates flared up again. Theodosius summoned another council to Ephesus, to resolve the disputes. At this council, Pope Leo I was the primary advocate for Pulcheria's claims of the doctrine, and he "…forcefully intervened, sending a long letter to Archbishop Flavian of Constantinople, in which he argued for the two natures, but questioned the legality of the recent condemnation of a certain Eutyches for denying them. At this the party of Dioscorus, Cyril's successor in Alexandria, having believed that Eutyches had renounced his heresy earlier, was able to overturn the situation, whereupon Leo asked for a second council, calling that [council in] Ephesus the Robber Council."

During this council, Flavian was beaten and died from his injuries. He was later declared a saint and martyr.

Two years later, Pulcheria and Marcian summoned the Council of Chalcedon, attended by 452 bishops. It condemned the doctrines of both Nestorius and Eutyches, developed the doctrines of Cyril and Pope Leo I into one, and it declared the doctrine of the "Theotokos" orthodox. It also reversed the decision of the second Council of Ephesus and denounced it as 'Robber Council'. According to historian Averil Cameron, the Council of Chalcedon "…developed and clarified the creed of Nicaea, according to which God was Father, Son and Holy Spirit, by further proclaiming that Christ was at all times after the Incarnation fully God and fully human." Pulcheria and Marcian were both hailed as the "new Constantine" and "new Helena" at the council. From this council grew an irreconcilable gulf between Chalcedonians, those who upheld the council's decision, and Miaphysites, whose persecution began in this period.

Pulcheria devoted the last years of her life to the "Theotokos", and had three churches in Constantinople dedicated to the Blessed Virgin Mary: the Monastery of the Panagia Hodegetria, the Church of St. Mary of Blachernae, and the Chalkoprateia.

Death and veneration
On what day in 453 Pulcheria died is unknown. She probably died in Constantinople. Her death shocked the people of Constantinople, since she had formed a bond with the city's inhabitants.

Even in her last days Pulcheria thought of ways to help the poor of Constantinople, for "in her will she reinforced that bond by instructing that all of her remaining wealth be distributed among the poor…"

After her death, she was declared a saint by the church, which is today the Roman Catholic Church and the Eastern Orthodox Church.

In art

Pulcheria brought many holy relics to churches in Constantinople. The Trier Adventus Ivory, now housed in the treasury of Trier Cathedral, Germany, has been interpreted as depicting the installation of one of these relics. Historian Kenneth Holum describes the Ivory thus: "On the Ivory Theodosius wears distinctive costume and inclines slightly forward, but essentially he remains only part of the cortege and thus of the ceremonial context. The direction of the wagon's movement inexorably toward the scene at the right, toward the diminutive woman clothed in the rich costume of an Augusta … in it she deposited the holy relics."

However, this interpretation is disputed, and another opinion is that the ivory shows the later Empress Irene of the eighth century, who sponsored renovation of the church.

See also

 Icon of the Hodegetria
 List of Byzantine emperors
 List of Roman and Byzantine Empresses
 Monastery of the Panaghia Hodegetria

Notes

References

 Cameron, Averil. The Mediterranean World In Late Antiquity AD 395–600 London: Routledge.
 Chestnut, Glenn F. The First Christian Histories: Eusibius, Socrates, Sozomen, Theodoret and Evagrius. Macon, GA: Mercer University Press. 1986 2nd Ed.
 Duckett, Eleanor. Medieval Portraits from East and West. Ann Arbor: The University of Michigan Press. 1972.
 Garland, Lynda. Byzantine empresses: women and power in Byzantium, AD 527–1204. London: Routledge. 1999.
 Holum, Kenneth G. Theodosian Empresses: Women and Imperial Dominion in Late Antiquity. Berkeley and Los Angeles: University of California Press. 1982.
 Jones, A.H.M; J.R. Martindale; and J. Morris. The Prosopography of the Later Roman Empire. Cambridge: Cambridge University Press. 1971.
 Pope St. Leo the Great. St. Leo the Great: Letters. Translated by Brother Edmund Hunt, C.S.C. New York: Fathers of the Church, Inc. 1957.
 Sozomen. The Ecclesiastical History of Sozomen: Comprising a History of the Church from A.D. 324 to A.D. 440. Translated by Edward Walford. London: Henry G. Bohn. 1855.
 Teetgen, Ada B. The Life and Times of Empress Pulcheria: A.D. 399–A.D. 452. London: Swan Sonnenshein & Co., Lim. 1907.
 Turpin, Joanne. Women in Church History: 20 Stories for 20 Centuries. Cincinnati, OH: St. Anthony Messenger Press. 1986.
 Limberis, Vasiliki. Divine Heiress: The Virgin Mary and the Creation of Christian Constantinople. London and New York: Routledge. 1994.
 Women in World History: a Biographical Encyclopedia. Edited by Anne Commire and Deborah Klezmer. Waterford, CN: Yorkin Publications. 1999–2002.

External links
 Santa Pulcheria – Santi e Beati

 
390s births
453 deaths
4th-century Byzantine people
5th-century Christian saints
4th-century Byzantine women
5th-century Byzantine empresses
Late Ancient Christian female saints
Saints from Roman Anatolia
Saints from Constantinople
Burials at the Church of the Holy Apostles
Byzantine female saints
Roman Catholic royal saints
Theodosian dynasty
Aelii
Augustae
Byzantine saints
Christian royal saints
Daughters of Roman emperors